The Inírida (Spanish: Río Inírida) is a river in the north-west of South America, in the territory of Colombia, the largest tributary of the Guaviare (the Orinoco River basin).

There are rapids and waterfalls in the upper and middle courses of the river. The river has a dark colour due to the abundance of plant residues.

It originates in the Tuhani mountains in the department of Guaviare,  from Cerro Pintado. In the upper course it flows first to the west, then turns to the east, on the plain it flows in a northeasterly direction.

See also
List of rivers of Colombia

References

Rand McNally, The New International Atlas, 1993.

Rivers of Colombia